Creutzfeldt–Jakob disease (CJD), also known as subacute spongiform encephalopathy or neurocognitive disorder due to prion disease, is an invariably fatal degenerative brain disorder. Early symptoms include memory problems, behavioral changes, poor coordination, and visual disturbances. Later symptoms include dementia, involuntary movements, blindness, weakness, and coma. About 70% of people die within a year of diagnosis. The name Creutzfeldt–Jakob disease was introduced by Walther Spielmeyer in 1922, after the German neurologists Hans Gerhard Creutzfeldt and Alfons Maria Jakob.

CJD is caused by a type of abnormal protein known as a prion. Infectious prions are misfolded proteins that can cause normally folded proteins to also become misfolded. About 85% of cases of CJD occur for unknown reasons, while about 7.5% of cases are inherited in an autosomal dominant manner. Exposure to brain or spinal tissue from an infected person may also result in spread. There is no evidence that sporadic CJD can spread among people via normal contact or blood transfusions, although this is possible in variant Creutzfeldt–Jakob disease. Diagnosis involves ruling out other potential causes. An electroencephalogram, spinal tap, or magnetic resonance imaging may support the diagnosis.

There is no specific treatment for CJD. Opioids may be used to help with pain, while clonazepam or sodium valproate may help with involuntary movements. CJD affects about one person per million people per year. Onset is typically around 60 years of age. The condition was first described in 1920. It is classified as a type of transmissible spongiform encephalopathy. Inherited CJD accounts for about 10% of prion disease cases. Sporadic CJD is different from bovine spongiform encephalopathy (mad cow disease) and variant Creutzfeldt–Jakob disease (vCJD).

Signs and symptoms

The first symptom of CJD is usually rapidly progressive dementia, leading to memory loss, personality changes, and hallucinations. Myoclonus (jerky movements) typically occurs in 90% of cases, but may be absent at initial onset. Other frequently occurring features include anxiety, depression, paranoia, obsessive-compulsive symptoms, and psychosis. This is accompanied by physical problems such as speech impairment, balance and coordination dysfunction (ataxia), changes in gait, and rigid posture. In most people with CJD, these symptoms are accompanied by involuntary movements. The duration of the disease varies greatly, but sporadic (non-inherited) CJD can be fatal within months or even weeks. Most affected people die six months after initial symptoms appear, often of pneumonia due to impaired coughing reflexes. About 15% of people with CJD survive for two or more years.

The symptoms of CJD are caused by the progressive death of the brain's nerve cells, which are associated with the build-up of abnormal prion proteins forming in the brain. When brain tissue from a person with CJD is examined under a microscope, many tiny holes can be seen where the nerve cells have died. Parts of the brain may resemble a sponge where the prions were infecting the areas of the brain.

Cause
CJD is a type of transmissible spongiform encephalopathy (TSE), which are caused by prions. Prions are misfolded proteins that occur in the neurons of the central nervous system (CNS). They are thought to affect signaling processes, damaging neurons and resulting in degeneration that causes the spongiform appearance in the affected brain.

The CJD prion is dangerous because it promotes refolding of native prion protein into the diseased state. The number of misfolded protein molecules will increase exponentially and the process leads to a large quantity of insoluble protein in affected cells. This mass of misfolded proteins disrupts neuronal cell function and causes cell death. Mutations in the gene for the prion protein can cause a misfolding of the dominantly alpha helical regions into beta pleated sheets. This change in conformation disables the ability of the protein to undergo digestion. Once the prion is transmitted, the defective proteins invade the brain and induce other prion protein molecules to misfold in a self-sustaining feedback loop. These neurodegenerative diseases are commonly called prion diseases.

People can also develop CJD because they carry a mutation of the gene that codes for the prion protein (PRNP). This occurs in only 5–10% of all CJD cases. In sporadic cases, the misfolding of the prion protein is a process that is hypothesized to occur as a result of the effects of aging on cellular machinery, explaining why the disease often appears later in life. An EU study determined that "87% of cases were sporadic, 8% genetic, 5% iatrogenic and less than 1% variant."

Transmission

The defective protein can be transmitted by contaminated harvested human brain products, corneal grafts, dural grafts, or electrode implants and human growth hormone.

It can be familial (fCJD); or it may appear without clear risk factors (sporadic form: sCJD). In the familial form, a mutation has occurred in the gene for PrP, PRNP, in that family. All types of CJD are transmissible irrespective of how they occur in the person.

It is thought that humans can contract the variant form of the disease by eating food from animals infected with bovine spongiform encephalopathy (BSE), the bovine form of TSE also known as mad cow disease. However, it can also cause sCJD in some cases.

Cannibalism has also been implicated as a transmission mechanism for abnormal prions, causing the disease known as kuru, once found primarily among women and children of the Fore people in Papua New Guinea, who previously engaged in funerary cannibalism. While the men of the tribe ate the muscle tissue of the deceased, women and children consumed other parts, such as the brain, and were more likely than men to contract kuru from infected tissue.

Prions, the infectious agent of CJD, may not be inactivated by means of routine surgical instrument sterilization procedures. The World Health Organization and the US Centers for Disease Control and Prevention recommend that instrumentation used in such cases be immediately destroyed after use; short of destruction, it is recommended that heat and chemical decontamination be used in combination to process instruments that come in contact with high-infectivity tissues.  Thermal depolymerization also destroys prions in infected organic and inorganic matter, since the process chemically attacks protein at the molecular level, although more effective and practical methods involve destruction by combinations of detergents and enzymes similar to biological washing powders.

Diagnosis

Testing for CJD has historically been problematic, due to nonspecific nature of early symptoms and difficulty in safely obtaining brain tissue for confirmation. The diagnosis may initially be suspected in a person with rapidly progressing dementia, particularly when they are also found with the characteristic medical signs and symptoms such as involuntary muscle jerking, difficulty with coordination/balance and walking, and visual disturbances. Further testing can support the diagnosis and may include:
 Electroencephalography – may have characteristic generalized periodic sharp wave pattern. Periodic sharp wave complexes develop in half of the people with sporadic CJD, particularly in the later stages.
 Cerebrospinal fluid (CSF) analysis for elevated levels of 14-3-3 protein could be supportive in the diagnosis of sCJD. However, a positive result should not be regarded as sufficient for the diagnosis. The Real-Time Quaking-Induced Conversion (RT-QuIC) assay has a diagnostic sensitivity of more than 80% and a specificity approaching 100%, tested in detecting PrPSc in CSF samples of people with CJD. It is therefore suggested as a high-value diagnostic method for the disease.
 MRI of the brain – often shows high signal intensity in the caudate nucleus and putamen bilaterally on T2-weighted images.

In recent years, studies have shown that the tumour marker neuron-specific enolase (NSE) is often elevated in CJD cases; however, its diagnostic utility is seen primarily when combined with a test for the 14-3-3 protein. , screening tests to identify infected asymptomatic individuals, such as blood donors, are not yet available, though methods have been proposed and evaluated.

Imaging 
Imaging of the brain may be performed during medical evaluation, both to rule out other causes and to obtain supportive evidence for diagnosis. Imaging findings are variable in their appearance, and also variable in sensitivity and specificity. While imaging plays a lesser role in diagnosis of CJD, characteristic findings on brain MRI in some cases may precede onset of clinical manifestations.

Brain MRI is the most useful imaging modality for changes related to CJD. Of the MRI sequences, diffuse-weighted imaging sequences are most sensitive. Characteristic findings are as follows:

 Focal or diffuse diffusion-restriction involving the cerebral cortex and/or basal ganglia. In about 24% of cases DWI shows only cortical hyperintensity; in 68%, cortical and subcortical abnormalities; and in 5%, only subcortical anomalies. The most iconic and striking cortical abnormality has been called "cortical ribboning" or "cortical ribbon sign" due to hyperintensities resembling ribbons appearing in the cortex on MRI. The involvement of the thalamus can be found in sCJD, is even stronger and constant in vCJD.
 Varying degree of symmetric T2 hyperintense signal changes in the basal ganglia (i.e., caudate and putamen), and to a lesser extent globus pallidus and occipital cortex.
 Cerebellar atrophy

Brain FDG PET-CT tends to be markedly abnormal, and is increasingly used in the investigation of dementias.
 Patients with CJD will normally have hypometabolism on FDG PET.

Histopathology 

Testing of tissue remains the most definitive way of confirming the diagnosis of CJD, although it must be recognized that even biopsy is not always conclusive.

In one-third of people with sporadic CJD, deposits of "prion protein (scrapie)", PrPSc, can be found in the skeletal muscle and/or the spleen. Diagnosis of vCJD can be supported by biopsy of the tonsils, which harbor significant amounts of PrPSc; however, biopsy of brain tissue is the definitive diagnostic test for all other forms of prion disease. Due to its invasiveness, biopsy will not be done if clinical suspicion is sufficiently high or low. A negative biopsy does not rule out CJD, since it may predominate in a specific part of the brain.

The classic histologic appearance is spongiform change in the gray matter: the presence of many round vacuoles from one to 50 micrometers in the neuropil, in all six cortical layers in the cerebral cortex or with diffuse involvement of the cerebellar molecular layer. These vacuoles appear glassy or eosinophilic and may coalesce. Neuronal loss and gliosis are also seen. Plaques of amyloid-like material can be seen in the neocortex in some cases of CJD.

However, extra-neuronal vacuolization can also be seen in other disease states. Diffuse cortical vacuolization occurs in Alzheimer's disease, and superficial cortical vacuolization occurs in ischemia and frontotemporal dementia. These vacuoles appear clear and punched-out. Larger vacuoles encircling neurons, vessels, and glia are a possible processing artifact.

Classification
Types of CJD include:
 Sporadic (sCJD), caused by the spontaneous misfolding of prion-protein in an individual. This accounts for 85% of cases of CJD.
 Familial (fCJD), caused by an inherited mutation in the prion-protein gene. This accounts for the majority of the other 15% of cases of CJD.
 Acquired CJD, caused by contamination with tissue from an infected person, usually as the result of a medical procedure (iatrogenic CJD). Medical procedures that are associated with the spread of this form of CJD include blood transfusion from the infected person, use of human-derived pituitary growth hormones, gonadotropin hormone therapy, and corneal and meningeal transplants. Variant Creutzfeldt–Jakob disease (vCJD) is a type of acquired CJD potentially acquired from bovine spongiform encephalopathy or caused by consuming food contaminated with prions.

Treatment 
As of 2023, there is no cure or effective treatment for CJD. Some of the symptoms like twitching can be managed, but otherwise treatment is palliative care. Psychiatric symptoms like anxiety and depression can be treated with sedatives and antidepressants. Myoclonic jerks can be handled with clonazepam or sodium valproate. Opiates can help in pain. Seizures are very uncommon but can nevertheless be treated with antiepileptic drugs.

Prognosis 

The condition is universally fatal. As of 1981, no one is known to have lived longer than 2.5 years after the onset of CJD symptoms. The longest recorded survivor of variant Creutzfeldt–Jakob disease (vCJD) was Jonathan Simms, a Northern Irish man who lived 10 years after his diagnosis.

Epidemiology 
CDC monitors the occurrence of CJD in the United States through periodic reviews of national mortality data. According to the CDC:
 CJD occurs worldwide at a rate of about 1 case per million population per year.
 On the basis of mortality surveillance from 1979 to 1994, the annual incidence of CJD remained stable at approximately 1 case per million people in the United States.
 In the United States, CJD deaths among people younger than 30 years of age are extremely rare (fewer than five deaths per billion per year).
 The disease is found most frequently in people 55–65 years of age, but cases can occur in people older than 90 years and younger than 55 years of age.
 In more than 85% of cases, the duration of CJD is less than one year (median: four months) after the onset of symptoms.

Further information from the CDC:
 Risk of developing CJD increases with age.
 CJD incidence was 3.5 cases per million among those over 50 years of age between 1979 and 2017.
 Approximately 85% of CJD cases are sporadic and 10-15% of CJD cases are due to inherited mutations of the prion protein gene.
 CJD deaths and age-adjusted death rate in the United States indicate an increasing trend in the number of deaths between 1979 and 2017.

Although not fully understood, additional information suggests that CJD rates in African American and nonwhite groups are lower than in whites. While the mean onset is approximately 67 years of age, cases of sCJD have been reported as young as 17 years and over 80 years of age. Mental capabilities rapidly deteriorate and the average amount of time from onset of symptoms to death is 7 to 9 months.

According to a 2020 systematic review on the international epidemiology of CJD:
 Surveillance studies from 2005 and later show the estimated global incidence is 1–2 cases per million population per year.
 Sporadic CJD (sCJD) incidence increased from the years 1990–2018 in the UK.
 Probable or definite sCJD deaths also increased from the years 1996–2018 in twelve additional countries.
 CJD incidence is greatest in those over the age of 55 years old, with an average age of 67 years old.

The intensity of CJD surveillance increases the number of reported cases, often in countries where CJD epidemics have occurred in the past and where surveillance resources are greatest. An increase in surveillance and reporting of CJD is most likely in response to BSE and vCJD. Possible factors contributing to an increase of CJD incidence are an aging population, population increase, clinician awareness, and more accurate diagnostic methods. Since CJD symptoms are similar to other neurological conditions, it is also possible that CJD is mistaken for stroke, acute nephropathy, general dementia, and hyperparathyroidism.

History 
The disease was first described by German neurologists Hans Gerhard Creutzfeldt in 1920 and shortly afterward by Alfons Maria Jakob, giving it the name Creutzfeldt–Jakob. Some of the clinical findings described in their first papers do not match current criteria for Creutzfeldt–Jakob disease, and it has been speculated that at least two of the people in initial studies had a different ailment. An early description of familial CJD stems from the German psychiatrist and neurologist Friedrich Meggendorfer (1880–1953). A study published in 1997 counted more than 100 cases worldwide of transmissible CJD and new cases continued to appear at the time.

The first report of suspected iatrogenic CJD was published in 1974. Animal experiments showed that corneas of infected animals could transmit CJD, and the causative agent spreads along visual pathways. A second case of CJD associated with a corneal transplant was reported without details. In 1977, CJD transmission caused by silver electrodes previously used in the brain of a person with CJD was first reported. Transmission occurred despite the decontamination of the electrodes with ethanol and formaldehyde. Retrospective studies identified four other cases likely of similar cause. The rate of transmission from a single contaminated instrument is unknown, although it is not 100%. In some cases, the exposure occurred weeks after the instruments were used on a person with CJD. In the 1980s it was discovered that Lyodura, a dura mater transplant product, was shown to transmit CJD from the donor to the recipient. This led to the product being banned in Canada but it was used in other countries such as Japan until 1993.

A review article published in 1979 indicated that 25 dura mater cases had occurred by that date in Australia, Canada, Germany, Italy, Japan, New Zealand, Spain, the United Kingdom, and the United States.

By 1985, a series of case reports in the United States showed that when injected, cadaver-extracted pituitary human growth hormone could transmit CJD to humans.

In 1992, it was recognized that human gonadotropin administered by injection could also transmit CJD from person to person.

Stanley B. Prusiner of the University of California, San Francisco (UCSF) was awarded the Nobel Prize in Physiology or Medicine in 1997 "for his discovery of Prions—a new biological principle of infection".

Yale University neuropathologist Laura Manuelidis has challenged the prion protein (PrP) explanation for the disease. In January 2007, she and her colleagues reported that they had found a virus-like particle in naturally and experimentally infected animals. "The high infectivity of comparable, isolated virus-like particles that show no intrinsic PrP by antibody labeling, combined with their loss of infectivity when nucleic acid–protein complexes are disrupted, make it likely that these 25-nm particles are the causal TSE virions".

Australia 
Australia has documented 10 cases of healthcare-acquired CJD (iatrogenic or ICJD). Five of the deaths resulted after the patients, who were in treatment either for infertility or short stature, were treated using contaminated pituitary extract hormone but no new cases have been noted since 1991. The other five deaths occurred due to dura grafting procedures that were performed during brain surgery, in which the covering of the brain is repaired. There have been no other ICJD deaths documented in Australia due to transmission during healthcare procedures.

New Zealand 
A case was reported in 1989 in a 25-year-old man from New Zealand, who also received dura mater transplant. Five New Zealanders have been confirmed to have died of the sporadic form of Creutzfeldt–Jakob disease (CJD) in 2012.

United States 
In 1988, there was a confirmed death from CJD of a person from Manchester, New Hampshire. Massachusetts General Hospital believed the person acquired the disease from a surgical instrument at a podiatrist's office. In 2007, Michael Homer, former Vice President of Netscape, had been experiencing consistent memory problems which led to his diagnosis. In September 2013, another person in Manchester was posthumously determined to have died of the disease. The person had undergone brain surgery at Catholic Medical Center three months before his death, and a surgical probe used in the procedure was subsequently reused in other operations. Public health officials identified thirteen people at three hospitals who may have been exposed to the disease through the contaminated probe, but said the risk of anyone's contracting CJD is "extremely low". In January 2015, former speaker of the Utah House of Representatives Rebecca D. Lockhart died of the disease within a few weeks of diagnosis. John Carroll, former editor of The Baltimore Sun and Los Angeles Times, died of CJD in Kentucky in June 2015, after having been diagnosed in January. American actress Barbara Tarbuck (General Hospital, American Horror Story) died of the disease on December 26, 2016. José Baselga, clinical oncologist having headed the AstraZeneca Oncology division, died in Cerdanya, March 21, 2021, from CJD.

Research

Diagnosis 
 In 2010, a team from New York described detection of PrPSc in sheep's blood, even when initially present at only one part in one hundred billion (10−11) in sheep's brain tissue. The method combines amplification with a novel technology called surround optical fiber immunoassay (SOFIA) and some specific antibodies against PrPSc. The technique allowed improved detection and testing time for PrPSc.
 In 2014, a human study showed a nasal brushing method that can accurately detect PrP in the olfactory epithelial cells of people with CJD.

Treatment 
 Pentosan polysulphate (PPS) was thought to slow the progression of the disease, and may have contributed to the longer than expected survival of the seven people studied. The CJD Therapy Advisory Group to the UK Health Departments advises that data are not sufficient to support claims that pentosan polysulphate is an effective treatment and suggests that further research in animal models is appropriate. A 2007 review of the treatment of 26 people with PPS finds no proof of efficacy because of the lack of accepted objective criteria, but it was unclear to the authors whether that was caused by PPS itself. In 2012 it was claimed that the lack of significant benefits has likely been caused because of the drug being administered very late in the disease in many patients.
 Use of RNA interference to slow the progression of scrapie has been studied in mice. The RNA blocks production of the protein that the CJD process transforms into prions.
 Both amphotericin B and doxorubicin have been investigated as treatments for CJD, but as yet there is no strong evidence that either drug is effective in stopping the disease. Further study has been taken with other medical drugs, but none are effective. However, anticonvulsants and anxiolytic agents, such as valproate or a benzodiazepine, may be administered to relieve associated symptoms.
 Quinacrine, a medicine originally created for malaria, has been evaluated as a treatment for CJD. The efficacy of quinacrine was assessed in a rigorous clinical trial in the UK and the results were published in Lancet Neurology, and concluded that quinacrine had no measurable effect on the clinical course of CJD.
 Astemizole, a medication approved for human use, has been found to have anti-prion activity and may lead to a treatment for Creutzfeldt–Jakob disease.
 A monoclonal antibody (code name PRN100) targeting the prion protein (PrP) was given to six people with Creutzfeldt–Jakob disease in an early-stage clinical trial conducted from 2018 to 2022. The treatment appeared to be well-tolerated and was able to access the brain, where it might have helped to clear PrPC. While the treated patients still showed progressive neurological decline, and while none of them survived longer than expected from the normal course of the disease, the scientists at University College London who conducted the study see these early-stage results as encouraging and suggest to conduct a larger study, ideally at the earliest possible intervention.

See also 
 Chronic traumatic encephalopathy
 Chronic wasting disease
 Kuru

References

External links 
 

Transmissible spongiform encephalopathies
Neurodegenerative disorders
Dementia
Rare infectious diseases
Wikipedia medicine articles ready to translate
Wikipedia neurology articles ready to translate
Rare diseases
1920 in biology